Shakti Singh may refer to:
Shakti Singh (16th century Indian noble), son of Maharana Udai Singh II Sisodia and Rani Sajja Bai Solankini
Shakti Singh (athlete) (born 1962), Indian track and field athlete
Shakti Singh (actor) (born 1955), Indian actor and voice actor
Shakti Singh (cricketer) (born 1968), Indian first-class cricketer turned playback singer